The Mohammed Goni College of Legal and Islamic Studies is a state government higher education institution located in Maiduguri, Borno State, Nigeria. The current Provost is Ali Shettima.

History 
The Mohammed Goni College of Legal and Islamic Studies was established in 1981.

Courses 
The institution offers the following courses;

 Early Childhood Care Education
 Kanuri
 History
 Primary Education
 Biology
 Political Science
 Hausa
 English
 Geography
 Islamic Studies
 Arabic

References 

Universities and colleges in Nigeria
1981 establishments in Nigeria